The 2015 Engie Open Nantes Atlantique was a professional tennis tournament played on indoor hard courts. It was the thirteenth edition of the tournament and part of the 2015 ITF Women's Circuit, offering a total of $50,000 in prize money. It took place in Nantes, France, on 2–8 November 2015.

Singles main draw entrants

Seeds 

 1 Rankings as of 26 October 2015

Other entrants 
The following players received wildcards into the singles main draw:
  Tessah Andrianjafitrimo
  Fiona Ferro
  Jessika Ponchet
  Irina Ramialison

The following players received entry from the qualifying draw:
  Xenia Knoll
  Chloé Paquet
  Sofia Shapatava
  Karolína Stuchlá

The following player received entry by a lucky loser spot:
  Claire Feuerstein

The following player received entry by a junior exempt:
  Jil Teichmann

Champions

Singles

 Mathilde Johansson def.  Andreea Mitu, 6–3, 6–4

Doubles

 Lenka Kunčíková /  Karolína Stuchlá def.  Kateřina Siniaková /  Renata Voráčová, 6–4, 6–2

External links 
 2015 Engie Open Nantes Atlantique at ITFtennis.com
  

2015 ITF Women's Circuit
2015 in French tennis
November 2015 sports events in France
Open Nantes Atlantique